Consultative Assembly may refer to:

Consultative Assembly (Luxembourg)
Consultative Assembly of Oman
Consultative Assembly of Qatar
Consultative Assembly of Saudi Arabia
Federal Consultative Assembly
Islamic Consultative Assembly
People's Consultative Assembly